The 2007 New Jersey State Senate elections were held on November 4.

The election took place midway through Jon Corzine's term as Governor of New Jersey. Democrats gained an additional seat by winning two Republican seats in South Jersey, though one-term Senator Ellen Karcher lost re-election to Jennifer Beck. The Democratic gains in South Jersey laid the groundwork for a transfer of power within the Democratic Party, culminating in Steve Sweeney's election as Senate President midway through the 2008–12 term.

Incumbents not running for re-election

Democratic 
 Wayne R. Bryant (District 5)
 Sharpe James (District 29)
 Bernard Kenny (District 33)
 Joseph Coniglio (District 38)

Republican 
 Martha W. Bark (District 8)
 Joseph A. Palaia (District 11)
 Peter Inverso (District 14)
 Walter J. Kavanaugh (District 16)
 Robert E. Littell (District 24)
 Robert J. Martin (District 26)
 Henry McNamara (District 40)

Summary of results by State Senate district

District 1

District 2

District 3

District 4

District 5

District 6

District 7

District 8

District 9

District 10

District 11

District 12

District 13

District 14

District 15

District 16

District 17

District 18

District 19

District 20

District 21

District 22

District 23

District 24

District 25

District 26

District 27

District 28

District 29

District 30

District 31

District 32

District 33

District 34

District 35

District 36

District 37

District 38

District 39

District 40

References 

New Jersey State Senate elections
New Jersey State Senate
2007 New Jersey elections